This is a list of notable individuals and organizations who have voiced their endorsement of Bernie Sanders' campaign for the Democratic Party's nomination for the 2020 U.S. presidential election before he dropped out of the race on April 8, 2020.

Federal officials

U.S. senators

Current
 Patrick Leahy, U.S. senator from Vermont (1975–present), Ranking Member of the Senate Appropriations Committee (2017–present), President pro tempore of the United States Senate (2012–2015), Chair (2007–2015, 2001–2003) and Ranking Member (2015–2017, 2003–2007, 1997–2001) of the Senate Judiciary Committee, Chair (1987–1995) and Ranking Member (1995–1997) of the Senate Agriculture Committee

Former
 Mike Gravel, U.S. senator from Alaska (1969–1981), 2020 and 2008 candidate for president (co-endorsement with Tulsi Gabbard)
 Donald Riegle, U.S. senator from Michigan (1976–1995), Chair of the Senate Banking Committee (1989–1995), U.S. representative from MI-07 (1967–1976)

U.S. representatives

Current
 Chuy García, U.S. representative from IL-04 (2019–present)
 Pramila Jayapal, U.S. representative from WA-07 (2017–present), Chair of the Congressional Progressive Caucus (2019–present)
 Ro Khanna, U.S. representative from CA-17 (2017–present) and Bernie Sanders 2020 presidential campaign national co-chair
 Alexandria Ocasio-Cortez, U.S. representative from NY-14 (2019–present)
 Ilhan Omar, U.S. representative from MN-5 (2019–present)
 Mark Pocan, U.S. representative from WI-2 (2013–present), Chair of the Congressional Progressive Caucus (2017–2021)
 Mark Takano, U.S. representative from CA-41 (2013–present), Chair (2019–present) and Ranking Member (2016–2017) of the House Veterans' Affairs Committee
 Rashida Tlaib, U.S. representative from MI-13 (2019–present)
 Peter Welch, U.S. representative from VT-AL (2007–present), 1990 nominee for Governor of Vermont

U.S. shadow congresspersons

Former 
 Jesse Jackson Sr., Shadow U.S. senator from the District of Columbia (1991–1997), 1988 and 1984 candidate for president, founder of Rainbow/PUSH

Former cabinet-level officials 
 Robert Reich, U.S. Secretary of Labor (1993–1997) (co-endorsement with Elizabeth Warren)

State officials

State executive officials

Current
 T. J. Donovan, Attorney General of Vermont (2017–present)
 Keith Ellison, Attorney General of Minnesota (2019–present), U.S. Representative from MN-5 (2007–2019), Chair of the Congressional Progressive Caucus (2011–2017), Deputy DNC Chair (2017–2018)
 Doug Hoffer, Vermont Auditor of Accounts (2013–present)
 Beth Pearce, Treasurer of Vermont (2011–present)
 Andru Volinsky, Member of the Executive Council of New Hampshire from District 2 (2017–present), candidate for Governor of New Hampshire in 2020
 David Zuckerman, Lieutenant Governor of Vermont (2017–present), candidate for Governor of Vermont in 2020 (VPP)
 Tony Vazquez, Member of the California State Board of Equalization (2019–present)

Former
 Jim Hightower, 8th Texas Agriculture Commissioner (1983–1991)

State legislators

Current
 Ako Abdul-Samad, Iowa Representative from District 35 (2007–present)
 Gabriel Acevero, Maryland Delegate from District 39 (2019–present)
 Joshua Adjutant, New Hampshire Representative from Grafton District 17 (2018–present)
 Rasheen Aldridge, Missouri Representative from District 78 (2020–present)
 Terry Alexander, South Carolina Representative from District 59 (2007–present)
 Carol Ammons, Illinois Representative from District 103 (2015–present)
 Saud Anwar, Connecticut Senator from District 3 (2019–present)
 Tim Ashe, Vermont Senator from Chittenden (2009–present), Vermont Senate President (2017–present)
 Chris Balch, New Hampshire Representative from Hillsborough District 38 (2018–present)
 Justin Bamberg, South Carolina Representative from District 90 (2014–present)
 Sam Bell, Rhode Island Senator from District 5 (2019–present)
 Charles Booker, Kentucky State Representative from District 43 (2019–present), 2020 Democratic candidate for the US Senate in Kentucky
 Amanda Bouldin, New Hampshire Representative from Hillsborough District 12 (2015–present)
 Andrew Bouldin, New Hampshire Representative from Hillsborough District 12 (2018–present)
 David Bowen, Wisconsin Assemblyman from District 10 (2014–present)
 Margie Bright Matthews, South Carolina Senator from District 45 (2015–present)
 Ryan Buchanan, New Hampshire Representative from Merrimack District 15 (2018–present)
 Ruth Buffalo, North Dakota Representative from District 27 (2018–present)
 Hunter Cantrell, Minnesota Representative from District 56A (2018–present)
 Lee Carter, Virginia Delegate from District 50 (2018–present)
 Wendy Chase, New Hampshire Representative from Strafford District 18 (2018–present)
 Justin Chenette, Maine Senator from District 31 (2016–present)
 Ben Chipman, Maine Senator from District 27 (2016–present)
 Kansen Chu, California Assemblymember from District 25 (2014–present)
 Skip Cleaver, New Hampshire Representative from Hillsborough District 35 (2016–present)
 Benjamin Collings, Maine Representative from District 42 (2016–present)
 Mike Connolly, Massachusetts Representative from Middlesex District 26 (2017–present)
 Scott Cuddy, Maine Representative from District 98 (2018–present)
 Robert Cushing, New Hampshire Representative from Rockingham District 21 (2012–present)
 Mike D'Agostino, Connecticut State Representative from District 91 (2012–present)
 Raymond Dehn, Minnesota Representative from District 59B (2013–present)
 Jamie Eldridge, Massachusetts Senator from Middlesex and Worcester District (2009–present)
 Arthur Ellison, New Hampshire Representative from Merrimack District 27 (2018–present)
 Nika Elugardo, Massachusetts Representative from Suffolk District 15 (2019–present)
 Paul Feeney, Massachusetts Senator from Bristol and Norfolk District (2017–present)
 Sallie Fellows, New Hampshire Representative from Grafton District 8 (2018–present)
 Elizabeth Fiedler, Pennsylvania Representative from District 184 (2019–present)
 Sherry Frost, New Hampshire Representative from Strafford District 16 (2016–present)
 Michael Gianaris, New York Senator from District 12 (2011–present)
 Wendell Gilliard, South Carolina Representative from District 111 (2009–present)
 Aisha Gomez, Minnesota Representative from District 62B (2019–present)
 Elizabeth Guzmán, Virginia Delegate from District 31 (2018–present)
 Will Guzzardi, Illinois Representative from District 39 (2015–present)
 Abdullah Hammoud, Michigan Representative from District 15 (2017–present)
 Bob Hasegawa, Washington Senator from District 11 (2013–present)
 Hodan Hassan, Minnesota Representative from District 62A (2019–present), Assistant Majority Leader
 Leon Howard, South Carolina Representative from District 76 (1995–present)
 Sara Innamorato, Pennsylvania Representative from District 21 (2019–present)
 Jeff Irwin, Michigan Senator from District 18 (2019–present)
 Troy Jackson, Maine Senator from District 1 (2008–2014, 2016–present), President of the Maine Senate (2018–present)
 Reggie Jones-Sawyer, California Assemblymember from District 59 (2012–present) (previously endorsed Kamala Harris)
 Ash Kalra, California Assemblymember from District 27 (2016–present)
 Cam Kenney, New Hampshire Representative from Strafford District 6 (2018–present)
 Christopher Kessler, Maine Representative from District 32 (2018–present)
 Ron Kim, New York Assemblymember from District 40 (2013–present)
 Mark King, New Hampshire Representative from Hillsborough District 33 (2016–present)
 Jeff Kurtz, Iowa Representative from District 83 (2019–present)
 Summer Lee, Pennsylvania Representative from District 34 (2019–present)
 Martin Looney, Connecticut Senator from District 11 (1993–present) and President pro tempore of the Connecticut Senate (2015–present)
 Liz Lovelett, Washington Senator from District 40 (2019–present)
 Carlos Mariani, Minnesota Representative from District 65B (1991–present)
 Paul Mark, Massachusetts Representative from Berkshire District 2 (2011–present)
 John Marty, Minnesota Senator from District 63 (1987–1993), District 54 (1993–2013) and District 66 (2013–present), 1994 nominee and 2010 candidate for Governor of Minnesota
 Krystle Matthews, South Carolina Representative from District 117 (2019–present)
 Genevieve McDonald, Maine Representative from District 134 (2018–present)
 Cezar McKnight, South Carolina Representative from District 101 (2014–present)
 David Miramant, Maine Senator from District 12 (2014–present)
 Michael Moran, Massachusetts Representative from Suffolk District 18 (2005–present)
 Walter T. Mosley, New York Assemblymember from District 57 (2013–present)
 Wayne Moynihan, New Hampshire Representative from Coos District 2 (1996–1998, 2012–present)
 Nancy Murphy, New Hampshire Representative from Hillsborough District 21 (2018–present)
 Rena Newell, Tribal Representative of the Passamaquoddy to the Maine House of Representatives (2016–present)
 Joe Nguyen, Washington Senator from District 34 (2019–present)
 Fran Nutter-Upham, New Hampshire Representative from Hillsborough District 33 (2018–present)
 Aarón Ortíz, Illinois Representative from District 1 (2019–present)
 Jerry Ortiz y Pino, New Mexico Senator from District 12 (2005–present)
 Chris Pearson, Vermont Senator from Chittenden (2017–present) (VPP)
 Robert Peters, Illinois Senator from District 13 (2019–present)
 Yousef Rabhi, Michigan Representative from District 53 (2017–present)
 Delia Ramirez, Illinois Representative from District 4 (2019–present)
 Jessica Ramos, New York Senator from District 13 (2019–present)
 Marcia Ranglin-Vassell, Rhode Island Representative from District 5 (2017–present)
 Ellen Read, New Hampshire Representative from Rockingham District 17 (2016–present)
 Cecilia Rich, New Hampshire Representative from Strafford District 18 (2018–present) (previously endorsed Cory Booker)
 Michael Rivers, South Carolina Representative from District 121 (2016–present)
 Isaac Robinson, Michigan Representative from District 4 (2019–2020)
 Angela Romero, Utah State Representative from District 26 (2013–present)
 Jacob Rosecrants, Oklahoma Representative from District 46 (2017–present)
 Deane Rykerson, Maine Representative from District 1 (2012–present)
 Lindsay Sabadosa, Massachusetts Representative from Hampshire District 1 (2019–present)
 Julia Salazar, New York Senator from District 18 (2019–present)
 Ibraheem Samirah, Virginia Delegate from District 86 (2019–present)
 Luis Sepúlveda, New York Senator from District 32 (2017–present) (previously endorsed Bill de Blasio)
 James Sanders Jr., New York Senator from District 10 (2013–present)
 Emily Sirota, Colorado Representative from District 9 (2019–present)
 Timothy J. Smith, New Hampshire Representative from Hillsborough District 17 (2012–present)
 Vaughn Stewart, Maryland Delegate for District 19 (2019–present)
 Mike Sylvester, Maine Representative from District 39 (2016–present)
 Janice Schmidt, New Hampshire Representative from Hillsborough District 28 (2016–present)
 Catherine Sofikitis, New Hampshire Representative from Hillsborough District 34 (2016–present)
 Phil Steck, New York Assemblymember from District 110 (2013–present)
 Mary Sullivan, Vermont State Representative from Chittenden (2015–present), DNC member from Vermont
 Rachel Talbot Ross, Maine Representative from District 40 (2016–present)
 Ivory Thigpen, South Carolina Representative from District 79 (2016–present)
 Dan Toomey, New Hampshire Representative from Hillsborough District 32 (2018–present)
 Sparky Von Plinsky, New Hampshire Representative from Cheshire District 7 (2018–present)
 Shedron Williams, South Carolina Representative from District 122 (2018–present)

Former
 Tom Ammiano, California Assemblymember from Districts 17 and 13 (2008–2014)
 Clem Balanoff, Illinois Representative from District 35/32 (1989–1995)
 Wenona Benally, Arizona Representative from District 7 (2017–2019)
 Jeanine Calkin, Rhode Island Senator from District 30 (2017–2018)
 Maralyn Chase, Washington Senator from District 32 (2011–2019), Washington State Representative from District 32 (2001–2011)
 Mark Dion, Maine Representative from District 113 (2010–2016)
 Carina Driscoll, Vermont Representative from Chittenden District 7–4 (2001–2003), stepdaughter of Bernie Sanders
 Eileen Ehlers, New Hampshire Representative from Merrimack District 9 (2006–2008)
 Lucy Flores, Nevada Assemblymember from District 28 (2011–2015) (previously endorsed Elizabeth Warren)
 Vincent Fort, Georgia Senator from District 39 (1996–2017)
 Sylvia Gale, New Hampshire Representative from Hillsborough District 28 (2012–2014)
 Beverly Hannon, Iowa Senator from District 22 (1985–1993)
 Kaniela Ing, Hawaii Representative from District 11 (2012–2018)
 Tishaura Jones, former Missouri State Representative from District 63 (2009–2013) and Treasurer of St. Louis (2013–present) (previously endorsed Elizabeth Warren) 
 Mark MacKenzie, New Hampshire Representative from Hillsborough District 17 (2016–2018), N.H. AFL–CIO President Emeritus
 Patrick K. McGowan, Maine Representative from District 29 (1980–1990)
 Michael Merrifield, Colorado Senator from District 11 (2015–2019), Colorado Representative from District 18 (2002–2010)
 Mindi Messmer, New Hampshire Representative from Rockingham District 24 (2016–2018)
 Kathleen O'Connor Ives, Massachusetts Senator from Essex District 1 (2013–2018)
 John Patrick, Maine Senator from District 18 (2010–2016)
 Christine Pellegrino, New York Assemblymember from District 9 (2017–2019)
 Joe Perry, Maine Senator from District 32 (2004–2010)
 C. J. Prentiss, Ohio Senator from District 21 (1999–2006), Ohio Representative from District 8 (1991–1998)
 Aaron Regunberg, Rhode Island Representative from District 4 (2015–2019)
 Joe Salazar, Colorado Representative from District 31 (2013–2019)
 Jimmy Tarlau, Maryland Delegate from District 47A (2015–2019)
 Nina Turner, Ohio Senator from District 25 (2008–2014), President of Our Revolution, Democratic National Committee member, 2020 national co-chair
 John Tuthill, New Hampshire Representative from Sullivan District 11 (1998–2000) (Independent)
 Litesa Wallace, Illinois Representative from District 67 (2014–2019)
 Mariko Yamada, California Assemblymember from District 4 and 8 (2008–2014)

Local and municipal officials

Mayors

Current
 Jesse Arreguín, Mayor of Berkeley, CA (2016–present)
 Bill de Blasio, Mayor of New York City, NY (2014–present) and 2020 presidential candidate
 Carmen Yulín Cruz, Mayor of San Juan, PR (2013–present), 2020 national co-chair
 Wilda Diaz, Mayor of Perth Amboy, NJ (2008–present)
 Chokwe Antar Lumumba, Mayor of Jackson, MS (2017–present)
 Ted Terry, Mayor of Clarkston, GA (2014–present), 2020 candidate for Senate, Democratic National Committee member

Former
 Gayle McLaughlin, Mayor of Richmond, CA (2007–2015) (former Green)
 Gus Newport, Mayor of Berkeley, CA (1979–1986)

Municipal executive officials

Current
 Chesa Boudin, District Attorney of San Francisco, CA (2020–2022)
 Tom Nelson, Outagamie County Executive (2011–present)
 Tishaura Jones, Treasurer of St. Louis, MO (2013–present) (previously endorsed Elizabeth Warren)
 Jumaane Williams, Public Advocate of New York City, NY (2019–present)

Former
 Abdul El-Sayed, Health Officer and executive director of the Detroit Health Department (2015–2018)

Municipal legislators

Current 
 Mike Bonin, Member of the Los Angeles City Council (2013–present)
 Justin Brannan, Member of the New York City Council (2018–present)
 Kendra Brooks, Member of the Philadelphia City Council (2019–present) (WFP)
 Alondra Cano, Member of the Minneapolis City Council (2014–present)
 Greg Casar, Member of the Austin City Council (2015–present)
 Candi CdeBaca, Member of the Denver City Council (2019–present)
 Gil Cedillo, Member of the Los Angeles City Council (2013–present), California Senator (2002–2010), California Assemblyperson (1998–2002, 2010–2012)
 Costa Constantinides, Member of the New York City Council (2014–present) (previously endorsed Elizabeth Warren)
 Jeremiah Ellison, Member of the Minneapolis City Council (2018–present)
 Jon Fishman, Member of Lincolnville, Maine Board of selectmen (2017–present), drummer in Phish
 Noel Gallo, Member of the Oakland City Council (2013–present)
 Matt Haney, Member of the San Francisco Board of Supervisors (2017–present)
 Safiya Khalid, Member of the Lewiston City Council (2019–present)
 Gordon Mar, Member of the San Francisco Board of Supervisors (2019–present)
 Teresa Mosqueda, Member of the Seattle City Council (2017–present)
 Aaron Peskin, Member of the San Francisco Board of Supervisors (2001–2009, 2015–present), President of the San Francisco Board of Supervisors (2005–2009)
 Dean Preston, Member of the San Francisco Board of Supervisors (2019–present)
 Carlos Ramirez-Rosa, Member of the Chicago City Council (2015–present)
 Rossana Rodriguez-Sanchez, Member of the Chicago City Council (2019–present)
 Hillary Ronen, Member of the San Francisco Board of Supervisors (2017–present)
 Helen Rosenthal, Member of the New York City Council (2014–present)
 Susan Sadlowski Garza, Member of the Chicago City Council (2015–present)
 Lorena González, Member of the Seattle City Council (2015–present), President of the Seattle City Council (2020–present)
 Helen Gym, Member of the Philadelphia City Council (2016–present)
 Brad Lander, Member of the New York City Council for District 39 (2009–present) (previously endorsed Elizabeth Warren)
 Tara Samples, Member of the Akron, Ohio City Council (2014–present), 2018 candidate for Lieutenant Governor of Ohio
 Mark Sanchez, Member of the San Francisco Board of Education from 2001 to 2009 and 2016–present, President of the Board from 2007 to 2009 and 2020–present, Vice President of the Board (2018–2019)
 Kshama Sawant, Member of the Seattle City Council (2014–present) (SA)
 Tick Segerblom, Member of the Clark County Commission (2019–present), Nevada Senator (2013–2018), Nevada Assemblyperson (2007–2013)
 Byron Sigcho-Lopez, Member of the Chicago City Council (2019–present)
 Jeanette B. Taylor, Member of the Chicago City Council (2019–present)
 Andre Vasquez, Member of the Chicago City Council (2019–present)
 Girmay Zahilay, Member of the King County Council from District 2 (2019–present)

Former
 John Avalos, Member of San Francisco Board of Supervisors (2009–2017)
 Jovanka Beckles, Member of the Richmond, California City Council (2010–2018)
 Cecil Bothwell, Member of the Asheville, North Carolina City Council (2009–2017)
 David Campos, Member of San Francisco Board of Supervisors (2008–2016), San Francisco Democratic Party Chair
 Rafael Espinal, Member of the New York City Council (2014–2020)
 Jim Keady, Member of the Asbury Park, New Jersey City Council (2005–08), Nike sweatshops activist
 Jane Kim, Member of the San Francisco Board of Supervisors (2011–2019)

Party officials

DNC members

Current
 Larry Cohen, DC, union leader and CWA president
 Michelle Deatrick, MI, chair and founder, DNC Environment and Climate Crisis Council, Vice Chair of Washtenaw County Commission
 Megan E. Green, DNC member from Missouri
 Ray McKinnon, DNC member from North Carolina
 Susie A. Shannon, DNC member from California
 Jeri D. Shepherd, DNC member from Colorado
 Yasmine P. Taeb, DNC member from Virginia, human rights attorney, Senior Policy Counsel at the Center for Victims of Torture
 Terry L. Tucker, DNC member from Colorado
 Curtis Wylde, DNC member from Missouri
 James Zogby, DC, founder and President of Arab American Institute

Former
 Derek Eadon, Chair of the Iowa Democratic Party (2017) (previously endorsed Julian Castro)

Other party officials
 Arun Chaudhary, political operative and filmmaker
 Peter Daou, former strategist for Hillary Clinton, John Kerry and Arlen Specter
 Faiz Shakir, political aide and 2020 campaign manager
 Brianna Westbrook, Arizona Democratic Party vice chair and candidate for Arizona's 8th congressional district in 2018

International politicians

Heads of state and government

Current
 Daniel Ortega, President of Nicaragua (1985–1990, 2007–present) (FSLN)

Former
 Rafael Correa, President of Ecuador (2007–2017) (PAIS)
 Evo Morales, President of Bolivia (2006–2019) (MAS-IPSP)
 Luiz Inácio Lula da Silva, President of Brazil (2003–2010) (PT)

Members of national and supranational parliaments

Current
 Diane Abbott, Labour Member of the British Parliament for Hackney North and Stoke Newington (1987–present), Shadow Home Secretary (2016–2020)
 Niki Ashton, New Democrat Member of the Canadian House of Commons for Churchill—Keewatinook Aski (2008–present)
 Richard Burgon, Labour Member of the British Parliament for Leeds East (2015–present), Shadow Secretary of State for Justice (2016–2020)
 Dan Carden, Labour Member of the British Parliament for Liverpool Walton (2017–present), Shadow Secretary of State for International Development (2018–2020)
 Martin Kolberg, Labour Member of the Norwegian Parliament for Buskerud (2009–present)
 Stefan Liebich, Left Member of the German Bundestag for Berlin-Mitte (2009–present)
 Audun Lysbakken, Socialist Left Party Member of the Norwegian Parliament for Hordaland and leader of the Socialist Left Party
 John McDonnell, Labour Member of the British Parliament for Hayes and Harlington (1997–present) and Shadow Chancellor of the Exchequer (2015–2020)
 Jean-Luc Mélenchon, La France Insoumise Member of the French National Assembly for Bouches-du-Rhône's 4th constituency (2017–present)
 Ali Milani, Labour councillor and 2019 United Kingdom general election parliamentary candidate for Uxbridge and South Ruislip, the constituency of Prime Minister Boris Johnson.
 Gustavo Petro, Humane Colombia Member of the Senate of Colombia (2018–present), Mayor of Bogotá (2012–2015) and candidate in the 2010 and 2018 Colombian presidential election
 Håkan Svenneling, Left Member of the Swedish Riksdag for Värmland County (2014–present)
 Jonas Sjöstedt, Left Member of the Swedish Riksdag for Västerbotten (2010–2020) and Leader of the Left Party of Sweden (2012–2020)
 , Socialist Member of the Dutch Senate (2015–present)
 Yanis Varoufakis, leader of MeRA25, Member of the Hellenic Parliament for Thessaloniki A (2015, 2019–present), economist, former Finance Minister and author

Former
 Nessa Childers, Independent Member of the European Parliament from Dublin (2009–2019)
 Giuseppe Civati, Democratic Member of the Italian Chamber of Deputies (2013–2018), founder of Possible
 Laura Pidcock, Labour Member of the British Parliament for North West Durham (2017–2019), Shadow Minister for Labour (2018–2019)
 Rui Tavares, Left Bloc and Independent Member of the European Parliament from Portugal (2009–2014), founder of LIVRE
 Chris Williamson, Independent Member of the British Parliament for Derby North (2010–2015, 2017–2019)

Other international politicians

Current
 Ross Greer, Green Member of the Scottish Parliament for West Scotland (2016–present)
 Richard Leonard, Labour Member of the Scottish Parliament for Central Scotland (2016–present), Leader of the Scottish Labour Party (2017–2021)
 Gabriel Nadeau-Dubois, Member of the National Assembly of Quebec for Gouin (2017–present) (Spokesperson of Québec solidaire)
 Larry Sanders, Green Party of England and Wales Health Spokesperson (2016–present) (brother of Bernie Sanders)

Notable individuals

Activists, humanitarians, and labor leaders
 Ana Maria Archila, activist and executive director of the Center for Popular Democracy
 Ady Barkan, healthcare activist and attorney (previously endorsed Elizabeth Warren)
 Jabari Brisport, activist, actor, teacher, and Democratic candidate for New York State Senate's 25th District
 Randy Bryce, ironworker, activist, and Democratic nominee for U.S. Representative from WI-01 in 2018
 Cori Bush, political activist, nurse, pastor, and future U.S. Representative from MO-1 (2021–present)
 Tiffany Cabán, candidate for Queens County District Attorney in 2019 and criminal justice reform activist
 Bonnie Castillo, executive director of National Nurses United and California Nurses Association/National Nurses Organizing Committee
 Charles R. Chamberlain, political leader and executive director at Democracy for America
 Rosa Clemente, community organiser, journalist, hip-hop activist, and Green Party of the United States vice-presidential nominee in 2008
 Patrisse Cullors, activist and co-founder of the Black Lives Matter movement. (co-endorsement with Elizabeth Warren)
 Ryan Deitsch, gun control activist and March for Our Lives co-founder
 RoseAnn DeMoro, former executive director of NNU and CNA/NNOC
 Barbara Ehrenreich, political commentator and author
 Noura Erakat, legal scholar, human rights attorney, activist, and writer
 Jodie Evans, political activist, author, and documentary film producer
 George Goehl, executive director of People's Action
 Isra Hirsi, environmental activist and co-founder and co-executive director of U.S. Youth Climate Strike (daughter of Ilhan Omar)
 Leah Hunt-Hendrix, activist, political theorist, and movement builder
 Ben Jealous, 2018 nominee for Governor of Maryland, president and chief executive officer of the National Association for the Advancement of Colored People (2008–2013)
 Cameron Kasky, gun control activist and March for Our Lives co-founder (previously endorsed Andrew Yang)
 Bob King, union leader and former UAW President
 Shaun King, writer and civil rights activist
 Naomi Klein, author and activist
 Nomiki Konst, political activist
 José La Luz, labor activist
 Miss Major Griffin-Gracy, trans woman activist and community leader for transgender rights, Stonewall riots veteran, and former executive director of the Transgender Gender Variant Intersex Justice Project
 Winona LaDuke, American environmentalist, economist, writer, executive director of Honor The Earth, and Green Party of the United States vice-presidential nominee in 1996 and 2000
 Jamie Margolin, climate activist
 Jane F. McAlevey, union organizer, scholar, author, and political commentator
 Maurice Mitchell, activist, musician, and National Director of the Working Families Party
 David Oks, political activist and campaign manager of Mike Gravel 2020 presidential campaign
 Carmen Perez, activist and national co-chair of the 2017 Women's March
 Rodrigo P. Pimentel, immigration rights activist and political commentator
 Varshini Prakash, environmental activist and founder and executive director of Sunrise Movement
 Qasim Rashid, political activist and Democratic candidate for Virginia's 28th Senate district in 2019 and Virginia's 1st congressional district in 2020
 Linda Sarsour, political activist and former executive director of Arab American Association of New York
 Azadeh N. Shahshahani, human rights attorney and former president of the National Lawyers Guild
 Barbara Smith, lecturer, author, scholar, lesbian feminist, and socialist
 Richard Stallman, founder of GNU Project and Free Software Foundation
 Paula Jean Swearengin, social and environmental activist and Democratic candidate for U.S. Senate from West Virginia (2018, 2020)
 Delaney Tarr, gun control activist and March for Our Lives co-founder
 Jonathan Tasini, former President of National Writers Union
 Henry Williams, political activist and chief of staff of Mike Gravel 2020 presidential campaign
 Marianne Williamson, spiritual leader, author, political activist, and 2020 presidential candidate
 Eddy Zheng, immigrant and criminal justice activist and youth counselor

Journalists and commentators
 Elizabeth Bruenig, writer and commentator
 Matt Bruenig, lawyer, blogger, policy analyst, commentator, and founder of the left-wing think tank People's Policy Project
 Laura Flanders, broadcast journalist
 Glenn Greenwald, Pulitzer Prize-winning journalist and founder of The Intercept
 Ana Kasparian, main-host and producer at The Young Turks
 Rania Khalek, journalist and political activist
 Aya de Leon, novelist, hip-hop theater and spoken-word artist, and professor at the University of California Berkeley
 Abby Martin, journalist and TV presenter
 Paul Mason, commentator and radio personality
 Chirlane McCray, editor, poet, and First Lady of New York City (2014–present)
 John Nichols, journalist and writer
 Hasan Piker, Twitch streamer and political commentator
 Nathan J. Robinson, editor-in-chief of Current Affairs
 Sarah Schulman, novelist, playwright, Gay Activist, AIDS historian, Distinguished Professor of the Humanities at College of Staten Island (CSI), Fellow at the New York Institute for the Humanities, and recipient of the Bill Whitehead Award
 Sam Seder, journalist, political commentator, and comedian
 David Sirota, political commentator, radio host, and 2020 campaign advisor and speechwriter
 Beverly Smith, writer, feminist, health advocate, instructor of Women's Health at the University of Massachusetts Boston, and author and member of the Combahee River Collective (twin sister of Barbara Smith)
 Norman Solomon, journalist, media critic, antiwar activist
 Bhaskar Sunkara, editor and publisher of Jacobin
 Mark Thompson, newscaster, anchor, and activist
 Opal Tometi, writer, human rights activist, strategist, community organizer, and co-founder of Black Lives Matter
 Cenk Uygur, co-host and founder of The Young Turks, co-founder of Justice Democrats, founder of Wolf PAC, candidate for California's 25th congressional district in 2020
 Antonia Zerbisias, journalist

Businesspeople
 Ben Cohen, co-founder of Ben & Jerry's and 2020 national co-chair
 Jerry Greenfield, co-founder of Ben & Jerry's
 Prabal Gurung, fashion designer
 Christine Hallquist, former CEO of Vermont Electric Cooperative and 2018 nominee for Governor of Vermont
 Adriel Hampton, digital media, fundraising, and organizing entrepreneur, strategist for political campaigns, and 2022 candidate for Governor of California
 Joe Sanberg, entrepreneur and investor, co-founder of Aspiration, Inc.
 Michael Sayman, app creator

Scholars and academics
 Melina Abdullah, civic leader, chair of Pan-African Studies Department at California State University, Los Angeles, and co-founder of the L.A. chapter of Black Lives Matter
 Abdul Alkalimat, professor of African-American studies and library and information science at the University of Illinois at Urbana–Champaign
 Eduardo Bonilla-Silva, professor of sociology at Duke University, former President of the American Sociological Association
 Hazel Carby, Charles C & Dorathea S Dilley Professor of African American Studies & American Studies at Yale University
 Noam Chomsky, linguist, philosopher, cognitive scientist, historian, social critic, and Institute Professor Emeritus at MIT
 Carole Boyce Davies, professor, author, scholar, and Professor of English and Africana Studies at Cornell University
 Dána-Ain Davis, professor of Urban Studies at Queens College, City University of New York (CUNY)
 Norman Finkelstein, political scientist, activist, and Israeli–Palestinian conflict and Holocaust scholar
 Nancy Fraser, philosopher, feminist theorist
 James K. Galbraith, economist and professor at The University of Texas at Austin
 Dayo Gore, African-American feminist scholar, professor of Ethnic Studies and Critical Gender Studies at the University of California, San Diego
 Nikhil Goyal, sociologist
 Darrick Hamilton, microeconomist, social scientist, and executive director of the Kirwan Institute for the Study of Race and Ethnicity at Ohio State University
 Michael Hanchard, political scientist, Gustave C. Kuemmerle Professor, and Chair of the Africana Studies Department at the University of Pennsylvania
 Kelly Lytle Hernández, historian, Thomas E. Lifka Chair in History at the UCLA, and MacArthur Fellowship recipient
 Marc Lamont Hill, academic, author, activist, television personality, and Steve Charles Chair in Media, Cities and Solutions at the College of Media and Education at Temple University
 Elizabeth Hinton, historian, professor in the Departments of History and African and African American Studies at Harvard University, and 2017 recipient of the Ralph Waldo Emerson Award
 Gerald Horne, historian, Moores Professor of History and African American Studies at the University of Houston
 Peter Kalmus, climate scientist, writer, and activist
 Harvey J. Kaye, historian and sociologist at the University of Wisconsin–Green Bay
 Robin Kelley, academic, Distinguished Professor and Gary B. Nash Endowed Chair in U.S. History at the University of California, Los Angeles, former Hamsworth Chair of American History at Oxford University (2009), and Guggenheim Fellowship recipient
 Stephanie Kelton, professor of public policy and economics at Stony Brook University
 Deborah E. McDowell, Alice Griffin Professor of English and Director of the Carter G. Woodson Institute at the University of Virginia
 Mireille Miller-Young, Associate Professor of Feminist Studies, University of California, Santa Barbara
 Leith Mullings, author, anthropologist, former President of the American Anthropological Association (2011–2013), Distinguished Professor of Anthropology Emerita at the Graduate Center of City University of New York
 Mark Anthony Neal, author, commentator and academic, and James B. Duke Distinguished Professor of African American Studies at Duke University
 Adolph L. Reed Jr., political science professor at the University of Pennsylvania
 Margo Okazawa-Rey, feminist, activist, writer, founding member of the Combahee River Collective, Barbara Lee Distinguished Chair in Women's Leadership at Mills College, and professor emerita of San Francisco State University
 Barbara Ransby, writer, historian, and Distinguished Professor of African American Studies, Gender and Women's Studies and History at the University of Illinois at Chicago
 Russell J. Rickford, scholar, author, Associate Professor of History at Cornell University, and 2010 co-winner of the American Book Award
 Jeffrey Sachs, economics professor at Columbia University
 Jane O'Meara Sanders, 4th President of Burlington College, wife of Bernie Sanders
 Kesho Y. Scott, professor emerita, Grinnell College, and 1988 winner of the American Book Award
 Lester Spence, media commentator and Professor of Political Science and Africana Studies at Johns Hopkins University
 Ramesh Srinivasan, professor at UCLA, founder of Digital Cultures Lab
 Sandra Steingraber, biologist and author
 Susan O'Neal Stryker, author, filmmaker, theorist, and professor of Gender and Women's Studies, former director of the Institute for LGBT Studies, and founder of the Transgender Studies Initiative at the University of Arizona
 Keeanga-Yamahtta Taylor, academic and writer
 Zephyr Teachout, attorney, author, professor at Fordham University, and candidate for New York State attorney general in 2018
 Cornel West, philosopher, political activist, and social critic
 George Yancy, philosopher and Samuel Candler Dobbs Professor of Philosophy at Emory University
 Slavoj Žižek, philosopher, researcher at the Department of Philosophy of the University of Ljubljana Faculty of Arts, and International director of the Birkbeck Institute for the Humanities of the University of London

Writers, filmmakers, and visual artists

Celebrities

Actors

Athletes and sports figures

Comedians

Media and internet personalities

Musicians

Labor organizations

National
 APWU – American Postal Workers Union, representing 200,000
 NNU – National Nurses United, representing 150,000
 NUHW – National Union of Healthcare Workers, representing 15,000 (co-endorsement with Elizabeth Warren)
 UE – United Electrical, Radio and Machine Workers of America, representing 35,900

State, regional, and local divisions

 Vermont State Labor Council AFL–CIO – representing 10,000

Political organizations

National

State, regional, and local divisions

International

Tribal organizations
 Minnesota Chippewa Tribe: White Earth Band of Ojibwe

Newspapers, magazines, and other media

Newspapers and magazines

General newspapers and magazines

Student newspapers

Social media
 Bernie Sanders' Dank Meme Stash, Facebook group with roughly 390,000 members
 da share z0ne, "Weird Twitter" account with 135,000+ followers
 New Urbanist Memes for Transit-Oriented Teens, Facebook group with roughly 175,000 members

Other

See also
 Endorsements in the 2020 Democratic Party presidential primaries
 News media endorsements in the 2020 United States presidential primaries
 List of Bernie Sanders 2016 presidential campaign endorsements
 List of Joe Biden 2020 presidential campaign endorsements

Notes

References

External links
 
 Official campaign website |official endorsements page
 Noteworthy Sanders endorsements Ballotpedia page section
 Endorsement of Sanders by Ocasio-Cortez, October 19, 2019 from C-SPAN

2020 United States presidential election endorsements
Endorsements
Lists of United States presidential candidate endorsements